A gubernatorial election was held on 11 July 2010 to elect the next governor of , a prefecture of Japan located in the Kansai region of Honshu island.

Candidates  

Yukiko Kada, incumbent since 2002, 60, former Kyoto Seika University Professor. She was backed by the SDP and DPJ.
Ken'ichirō Ueno, 44, former representative, bureaucrat in the Ministry of Internal Affairs and Communications. He was supported by the LDP and Komeito.
Hideaki Maruoka, endorsed by JCP.

Results

References 

2010 elections in Japan
Shiga gubernational elections
Politics of Shiga Prefecture
July 2010 events in Japan